William Francis Kuntz II (born June 24, 1950) is a Senior United States district judge of the United States District Court for the Eastern District of New York.

Early life and education 
Born in New York City, Kuntz graduated from Fordham Preparatory School in 1968, and earned an Artium Baccalaureus in 1972 from Harvard College. He then earned an Artium Magister in 1974 and a Doctor of Philosophy in 1979 from Harvard University and a Juris Doctor in 1977 from Harvard Law School.

Professional career 
From 1978 until 1986, Kuntz was an associate in the New York law firm Shearman & Sterling. From 1986 until 1994, Kuntz was a partner in the New York law firm Milgrim Thomajan Jacobs & Lee, and from 1994 until 2001, Kuntz was a partner in the New York law firm Seward & Kissel. From 2001 until 2004, he was a partner in the New York office of the Canadian law firm Torys LLP, and from 2004 until 2005, he was counsel at the New York law firm Constantine & Cannon. From 2005 until becoming a federal judge, Kuntz was a partner in the New York office of the law firm Baker Hostetler. His specialty is commercial and labor litigation. Prior to his appointment to the EDNY, Kuntz was the New York City Council’s designee from Kings County to the Civilian Complaint Review Board from October 1993 through 2010.

Federal judicial service 
On March 9, 2011, President Obama nominated Kuntz to fill a seat on the United States District Court for the Eastern District of New York that became vacant when Judge Nina Gershon took senior status in 2008. The United States Senate confirmed Kuntz by unanimous consent on October 3, 2011. He received his judicial commission the following day. Kuntz assumed senior status on January 1, 2022.

Personal 
Kuntz's wife, Dr. Alice Beal, is the director of palliative care for the New York Harbor Healthcare System Veterans Administration. They live in Brooklyn, New York, where they are members of the parish of the Brooklyn Oratory of St. Boniface. Their son Will is the vice president of soccer operations and assistant general manager for Los Angeles FC, and one daughter, Katharine Meleney is a physician, trained in infectious diseases, and another daughter, Elizabeth, is a librarian.

See also 
 List of African-American federal judges
 List of African-American jurists

References

External links

1950 births
Living people
African-American judges
Brooklyn Law School faculty
Harvard Law School alumni
Harvard College alumni
Judges of the United States District Court for the Eastern District of New York
United States district court judges appointed by Barack Obama
21st-century American judges
African-American lawyers
People associated with BakerHostetler
Fordham Preparatory School alumni